Five Forks is the name of several populated places in the U.S. state of Virginia.

Five Forks, Amherst County, Virginia
Five Forks, Bedford County, Virginia
Five Forks, Carroll County, Virginia
Five Forks, Chesterfield County, Virginia
Five Forks, Dinwiddie County, Virginia
Five Forks, Fairfax County, Virginia
Five Forks, Halifax County, Virginia
Five Forks, Hopewell, Virginia
Five Forks, James City County, Virginia
Five Forks, Lunenburg County, Virginia
Five Forks, Madison County, Virginia
Five Forks, Nelson County, Virginia
Five Forks, Patrick County, Virginia
Five Forks, Prince Edward County, Virginia
Five Forks, Rappahannock County, Virginia

See also
Arlington-Five Forks-Kenwood, Prince George County, Virginia